Govindaya Namaha ( Hail Govinda) is a 2012 Indian Kannada language comedy drama film directed by debutante Pawan Wadeyar. The film was released on 30 March 2012 across cinema halls. It stars Komal Kumar, Anna Georgia, Madhulika, Rekha Vedavyas and Parul Yadav in the lead roles. The music is composed by Gurukiran. This film is remade as Potugadu in Telugu. The movie was accused to be a copy of 2006 Kannada movie Avnandre Avne. However Karnataka Film Directors Association writer's wing set aside the allegations as far from truth.

Music of this film has been received well and the song Pyarge Aagbittaite written by Pawan in Kannada and Urdu language mixture recorded an amazing hit in YouTube by hitting more than 1500000 views in less than a week of its release. This song is performed by Chethan and Indu Nagaraj and music by Gurukiran song was picturized on Komal Kumar and Parul at Bijapur Fort and Ibrahim Roza.

Plot
Govinda pretends to be in love with three women later cheats and abandons them. However, he realises his mistake when the woman he loves cheats on him.

Cast
 Komal Kumar as Govinda
 Parul Yadav as Mumtaz
 Madhulika as Vydehi
 Rekha Vedavyas
 Anna Georgia
 H G Dattatreya
 Mukhyamantri Chandru as Vydehi's father
 Harish Raj as Harsha
 Vinayak Joshi
 Chandru
Tabla Nani as Nataraj 
Dattatreya H. G. 
Chikkanna as Gopal 
Sandeep Gowda as Pids Pokesh 
Kirloskar Sathya 
Raju Thalikote 
Jayasheela Gowda

Soundtrack

Gurukiran composed the film's background score and music for its soundtrack, with the lyrics penned by Pawan Wadeyar, Santhosh Nayak, Shivananje Gowda and Jayant Kaikini. The album consists of five tracks.

Reception

Critical response 

A critic from The Times of India scored the film at 3.5 out of 5 stars and says "Don't miss the popular number Pyar ke Aagbuttaithe sung by Chethan and Indu Nagaraj to the lyric penned by Pavan Wadeyar, and excellent costume designing by Shachina Heggar, and the dance choreographed by Murali. A critic from News18 India wrote "'Govindaya Namaha' is an entertainer which should be watched for its entertaining values and it carries the message about futility of committing suicide". A critic from NDTV wrote "Govindaya Namaha is an entertainer which should be watched for its entertaining values and it carries the message about futility of committing suicide". A critic from Bangalore Mirror wrote  "One thing that bugged audience on Day 1 was the dull look of the film which  can be blamed on the satellite broadcast. More than 90 per cent of theatres screening the film are through satellite broadcast rather than the stock reel". A critic from The New Indian Express wrote "The only consolation are the four duets that are shot well with good editing. Gurukiran’s music has added popularity to the film. Parul Yadav makes for a gorgeous nurse and can be commended for her acting".

Box office 
The film was a surprise box office success and ran for a hundred days.

Awards

References

External links 
 

2012 films
2012 comedy-drama films
Films scored by Gurukiran
Kannada films remade in other languages
2010s Kannada-language films
Films shot in Bijapur, Karnataka
Films directed by Pavan Wadeyar
2012 directorial debut films
2012 comedy films
Indian comedy-drama films